Napa River Inn, in Napa Valley, California, is a historic hotel dating from 1884.  It is located on the Napa River within part of  the historic Napa Mill, which is now also a commercial establishment with dining, shopping, spa treatments, and entertainment.

In 1884 or 1886 Captain Albert Hatt used the mill as a warehouse for serving local vineyards.  The Napa River Inn was built inside the historic Napa mill building in the 1990s, "with interior design inspiration coming from the renowned Sandra Blake."

It has been alleged the inn is haunted by the ghost of Albert Hatt, Jr., who died by hanging himself in the warehouse in 1912. It was featured in a 2002 episode of Haunted Hotels as a place where spectral lovers search for each other from beyond.

The inn was listed on the National Registry of the Historic Hotels of America in 2004.

In 2012, approval to expand the hotel by 26 rooms, adding a third floor, was received.

After a seven-year hiatus, expansion of the hotel finally began in 2019.

References

Historic Hotels of America
Hotels in California
Napa Valley
1884 establishments in California